This article presents the discography of American Traditional Pop music singer, Patti Page.

Between 1948 and 1982, Patti Page has charted a total of 110 hits on Billboard's Top Sellers / Pop Singles Chart, the Hot Adult Contemporary Tracks chart, and the Hot Country Songs chart. Four of these singles peaked at #1, all on the Billboard Pop Chart between 1950 and 1953. Also, since 1951, Page has released 39 studio albums, three of which were recorded as tribute albums. She recorded one live album in 1998 at Carnegie Hall, which gave Page her first Grammy award.

Studio albums

1950s

1960s

1970s–2000s

Compilation albums

Live albums

Singles

1940s

1950s

1960s

1970s and 1980s

Other singles

Collaborative singles

Holiday singles

Charted B-sides

Notes

A^ Re-recorded versions of the original singles.
B^ Did not enter the Billboard Hot 100 but peaked on the Bubbling Under Hot 100 Singles chart.

References

External links

Country music discographies
Discographies of American artists